James Freeman Dana (born in Amherst, New Hampshire, 23 September 1793; died in New York City, 14 April 1827) was an American chemist.

Biography
He graduated from Harvard in 1813, and from the medical school in 1817. He studied with Dr. John Gorham, and developed such ability that in 1815 he was selected by the authorities of Harvard to procure for the chemical laboratory a new outfit of apparatus. For this purpose, he visited London, where for six months he worked in the laboratory of Friedrich Christian Accum.

On his return to the United States he settled in Cambridge, where he practised medicine and was appointed assistant to the chair in chemistry. In 1817 he was invited to lecture on chemistry at Dartmouth, and in 1820 became the first professor of chemistry and mineralogy there. He was chosen professor of chemistry in the New York College of Physicians and Surgeons in 1825, and continued as such until his death.

Works
While a student in Cambridge, he received the Boylston Prize for a dissertation on the “Tests for Arsenic,” and again in 1817 received the same prize for an essay on the “Composition of Oxymuriatic Acid.” He contributed numerous scientific memoirs to Silliman's American Journal of Science and to the Annals of the New York Lyceum of Natural History. His larger works are Outlines of Mineralogy and Geology of Boston and its Vicinity (Boston, 1818), coauthored with his brother Samuel Luther Dana, and Epitome of Chemical Philosophy (Concord, New Hampshire, 1825).

Notes

References

1793 births
1827 deaths
American chemists
Dartmouth College faculty
People from Amherst, New Hampshire
American mineralogists
Harvard Medical School alumni